HMS Abeille was a French Navy 14-gun cutter launched in 1793 under the name Bonnet Rouge that  captured in 1796. She was taken into the Royal Navy as HMS Abeille, but apparently never served and was broken up in 1798.

French service and capture
Abeille was a Montagne-class cutter built to a design by Daniel Denÿs and launched in October 1793 at Saint-Malo as Bonnet Rouge.

Between March and July 1795, while under the command of ensigne de vaiseau Denis, she cruised between Brest and Loctudy, and return. She then cruised in the Gulf of Gascony with the division under the command of Contre-Admiral Vence. She was at the First Battle of Groix in June 1795, but like all the smaller vessels, did not participate in the action.

She was officially renamed Abeille on 30 May 1795. Later, under the command of lieutenant de vaisseau Denis-Lagarde, she was stationed at the Île de Batz.

On 2 May 1796, Dryad, under Acting-Commander John Pullin, captured Abeille some 16 or 17 leagues off The Lizard. At the time, Abeille was three days out of Brest and had not taken anything. The Royal Navy took her into service under her existing name.

Fate
There is no record that HMS Abeille ever actually served in the Royal Navy. She was broken up in 1798.

Citations and references
Citations

References
 
 
 
 
 

Cutters of the Royal Navy
Captured ships
1793 ships
Cutters of the French Navy